Defence Australia is a department of the Government of Australia charged with the responsibility to defend Australia and its national interests. Along with the Australian Defence Force (ADF), it forms part of the Australian Defence Organisation (ADO) and is accountable to the Commonwealth Parliament, on behalf of the Australian people, for the efficiency and effectiveness with which it carries out the Government's defence policy.

The head of the department, who leads it on a daily basis, is the Secretary of the Department of Defence (SECDEF), currently Greg Moriarty. The Secretary reports to the Minister of Defence, Richard Marles.

History
Australia has had at least one defence-related government department since Federation in 1901. The first Department of Defence existed from 1901 until 1921. In 1915, during World War I, a separate Department of the Navy was created. The two departments merged in 1921 to form the second Department of Defence, regarded as a separate body.

A major departmental reorganisation occurred in the lead-up to World War II. The Department of Defence was abolished and replaced with six smaller departments – the Defence Co-ordination (for defence policy, financial, and administrative matters), three "service departments" (Army, Navy, and Air), the Supply and Development (for munitions and materiel), and Civil Aviation. The current Department of Defence was formally created in 1942, when Prime Minister John Curtin renamed the existing Department of Defence Co-ordination. The other defence-related departments underwent a series of reorganisations, before being merged into the primary department over the following decades. This culminated in the abolition of the three service departments in 1973. A new Department of Defence Support was created in 1982, but abolished in 1984.

In May 2022 the department was renamed Defence Australia.

Defence Committee
The Defence Committee is the primary decision-making committee in the Department of Defence, supported by six subordinate committees, groups and boards. The Defence Committee is focused on major capability development and resource management for the Australian Defence Organisation and shared accountability of the Secretary and the Chief of the Defence Force.

The members of the Defence Committee are:

 Secretary of the Department of Defence (SECDEF)
 Chief of the Defence Force (CDF)
 Vice Chief of the Defence Force (VCDF)
 Associate Secretary
 Chief of Navy (CN)
 Chief of Army (CA)
 Chief of Air Force (CAF)
 Chief of Joint Operations (CJOPS)
 Deputy Secretary for Capability Acquisition and Sustainment
 Deputy Secretary for Strategic Policy and Intelligence
 Chief Defence Scientist (CDS)
 Chief of Joint Capabilities (CJC)
 Chief Information Officer (CIO)
 Chief Finance Officer (CFO)
 Deputy Secretary for People
 Deputy Secretary for Estate and Infrastructure

Organisational groups

 the Department of Defence consists of ten major organisational groups:
 Associate Secretary Groupprovides administrative, legal and governance services including audit and fraud control, security and vetting, the Judge Advocate General, and communications and ministerial support.
 Chief Information Officer Groupleads the integrated design, cost effective delivery, and sustained operation of Defence information
 Chief Finance Officer Groupto drive the financial and management improvement programs for Defence
 Capability Acquisition and Sustainment Group (CASG) Australia's largest project management organisation and its mission is to acquire and sustain equipment for the Australian Defence Force, created through the amalgamation of the Capability Development Group and Defence Materiel Organisation in 2015.
 Defence People Grouphuman resource outcomes across the Defence employment cycle from strategy and policy development, through to implementation and service delivery
 Defence Estate and Infrastructure Groupconsolidated service delivery organisation for Defence that enables Defence capability by working in partnership to deliver integrated services through a highly capable workforce
 Defence Science and Technology Grouplead agency charged with applying science and technology to protect and defend Australia and its national interests
 Defence Strategic Policy and Intelligence Groupprovides policy advice and coordination for strategy and intelligence for Defence, including overseeing the Defence Intelligence Organisation, Australian Signals Directorate, and the Australian Geospatial-Intelligence Organisation

Diarchy
The Chief of the Defence Force (CDF) and the Secretary of the Department of Defence (SECDEF) jointly manage the Australian Defence Organisation (ADO) under a diarchy in which both report directly to the Minister for Defence and the Assistant Minister for Defence. The ADO diarchy is a governance structure unique in the Australian Public Service.

List of departmental secretaries
The Secretary of the Department of Defence (SECDEF) is a senior public service officer and historically the appointees have not come from military service.

See also

 Australian Defence Organisation
 Current senior Australian Defence Organisation personnel
 Minister for Defence
 Minister for Defence Science and Personnel
 Minister for Veterans' Affairs
 Minister for Defence Industry
 List of Australian Commonwealth Government entities
 Department of the Army (Australia)
 Department of the Navy (Australia)
 Department of Air (Australia)
 United States Department of Defense
 United Kingdom Ministry of Defence
 Canadian Department of National Defence
 New Zealand Ministry of Defence

References

External links
 Department of Defence website
 
 
 

 
Military of Australia
Australian Defence Force
Defence
Australia